Union of the Democratic Centre or Union of the Democratic Center may refer to:

Union of the Democratic Centre (Argentina), a centrist party in Argentina
Union of the Democratic Centre (Greece), a former liberal party in Greece
Union of the Democratic Center (Mauritania),  a parliamentary party in Mauritania
Union of the Democratic Centre (Spain), a former centrist party in Spain